Marmandi Azim is a town and union council of Lakki Marwat District in Khyber Pakhtunkhwa province of Pakistan.

References

Union councils of Lakki Marwat District
Populated places in Lakki Marwat District